Miss Oceana (1981–1988) was an American Thoroughbred racehorse who won six Grade 1 stakes during her racing career and was sold for a World Record price as a broodmare.

Background
Bred and raced by Mark Hardin's and the Schwab families' Newstead Farm of Upperville, Virginia, Miss Oceana was sired by U.S. Racing Hall of Fame inductee Alydar. Her dam was the good racing mare Kittiwake, who was owned by Mark Hardin's stepmother, Katherine Bliss Hardin. Kittiwake was a daughter of the Sea-Bird, winner of the 1965 Epsom Derby and Prix de l'Arc de Triomphe, and a French Horse Racing Hall of Fame inductee who earned a Timeform rating of 145 that as at March 2010 remains the highest in racing history

Racing career
Trained by Hall of Fame inductee Woody Stephens, at age two Miss Oceana won the Grades 1 Arlington-Washington Lassie, Frizette, and Selima Stakes and was runnerup to Althea for American Champion Two-Year-Old Filly honors.

At age three, Miss Oceana won six important races including the Grades 1 Acorn Stakes, Gazelle Handicap, and Maskette Stakes. Once again, she was beaten out for an Eclipse Award, finishing behind Life's Magic in the voting for American Champion Three-Year-Old Filly honors.

Record selling price
Retired from racing with earnings in excess of $1 million, Miss Oceana was bred to super-sire Northern Dancer. While in foal, she was sold in a November 10, 1985, Fasig-Tipton dispersal of Newstead Farm's breeding stock. Financier Carl Icahn paid a then-world-record price for a broodmare of US$7 million.

Breeding record
Miss Oceana's foal, named Oceanic Dancer, had no success in racing and was sold to a breeding operation in Venezuela where he sired six Black Type winners. Carl Icahn next bred Miss Oceana to 1977 U.S. Triple Crown winner, Seattle Slew. Miss Oceana died in 1988 following complications while giving birth to the Seattle Slew colt that was named Cien Fuegos. Sold at auction as a yearling for $450,000, Cien Fuegos met with very limited success in racing and modest success at stud.

Pedigree

References
 Miss Oceana's pedigree and partial racing stats

1981 racehorse births
1988 racehorse deaths
Thoroughbred family 4-m
Racehorses bred in Kentucky
Racehorses trained in the United States